Joe Wilkinson (born September 3, 1946) is an American politician. He is a member of the Georgia House of Representatives from the 52nd District, serving since 2000. He is a member of the Republican party.

References

Living people
Republican Party members of the Georgia House of Representatives
1946 births
Politicians from Atlanta
21st-century American politicians